Geoffrey Henry "George" Heineman (17 December 1905 – 1970) was an English professional footballer who played in the Football League for Manchester City, Coventry City, Crystal Palace and Clapton Orient as a defender.

Career
Heineman was born in Stafford and began his career with Stafford Rangers. He moved to Manchester City on 29 October 1928, and made 24 appearances in all competitions for the Sky Blues. He joined Coventry City in May 1931 and stayed for two seasons. He scored one goal for Coventry, in a 5–5 draw against Fulham in January 1932.

He signed for Crystal Palace in August 1934. Over the next season, he made 25 appearances for Palace, without scoring. In August 1935, he moved on to Clapton Orient, playing in East London for three seasons. He left in January 1938 to join Wellington Town, and he won the Welsh Cup with them in 1939–40.

Heineman died in 1970 aged 64–65.

References

External links
Heineman at holmesdale.net

1905 births
1970 deaths
Association football defenders
English Football League players
Stafford Rangers F.C. players
Manchester City F.C. players
Coventry City F.C. players
Crystal Palace F.C. players
Leyton Orient F.C. players
Telford United F.C. players
English footballers